The 2017–18 Cleveland State Vikings men's basketball team represented Cleveland State University in the 2017–18 NCAA Division I men's basketball season. They were coached by first-year head coach Dennis Felton. The Vikings played their home games at the Wolstein Center as members of the Horizon League. They finished the season 12–23, 6–12 in Horizon League play to finish in a tie for eighth place. As the No. 8 seed at the Horizon League tournament, they defeated Youngstown State and upset No. 1 seed Northern Kentucky and No. 4 seed Oakland to advance to the championship game where they lost to Wright State.

Previous season
The Vikings finished the 2016–17 season 9–22, 5–13 in Horizon League play to finish in ninth place. They lost in the first round of the Horizon League tournament to Youngstown State.

On March 7, 2017, head coach Gary Waters retired. He finished at Cleveland State with an 11-year record of 194–172. On March 24, the school hired former Georgia and Western Kentucky head coach Dennis Felton.

Offseason

Departures

Incoming transfers

2017 recruiting class

Roster

Schedule and results

|-
!colspan=9 style=| Exhibition

|-
!colspan=9 style=| Non-Conference regular season

|-
!colspan=9 style=| Horizon League regular season

|-
!colspan=9 style=|Horizon League tournament

Source

References

2017–18 Horizon League men's basketball season
2017-18
2017 in sports in Ohio
2018 in sports in Ohio